Kazakhstan competed at the 2012 Winter Youth Olympics in Innsbruck, Austria.

Medalists

Alpine skiing

Kazakhstan qualified 2 athletes.

Boys

Girls

Biathlon

Kazakhstan qualified 3 athletes.

Boys

Girls

Mixed

Cross-country skiing

Kazakhstan qualified 2 athletes.

Boys

Girls

Sprint

Mixed

Figure skating

Kazakhstan qualified 3 athletes.

Boys

Pairs

Mixed

Freestyle skiing

Kazakhstan qualified 1 athlete.

Ski Cross

Ice hockey

Kazakhstan qualified a women's team.

Roster

 Nargiz Assimova
 Malika Bulembayeva
 Kamila Gembitskaya
 Anel Karimzhanova
 Botagoz Khassenova
 Anastassiya Kryshkina
 Olga Lobova
 Anastassiya Matussevich
 Raissa Minakova
 Olessya Mironenko
 Zaure Nurgaliyeva
 Zhanna Nurgaliyeva
 Anastassiya Ogay
 Akzhan Oxykbayeva
 Meruyert Ryspek
 Assem Tuleubayeva
 Saltanat Urpekbayeva

Group A

Semifinals

Bronze medal game

Luge

Kazakhstan qualified 4 athletes.

Boys

Girls

Team

Short track

Kazakhstan qualified 1 athlete.

Girls

Mixed

Ski jumping

Kazakhstan qualified 1 athlete.

Boys

Speed skating

Kazakhstan qualified 4 athletes.

Boys

Girls

See also
Kazakhstan at the 2012 Summer Olympics

References

2012 in Kazakhstani sport
Nations at the 2012 Winter Youth Olympics
Kazakhstan at the Youth Olympics